Hinterland is the second studio album by Manchester solo artist Julie Campbell, known as Lonelady, released in 2015 by Warp.

Background and recording
Campbell drew inspiration for the album from the landscapes of her childhood home in Audenshaw and the tower block she had been living in as an adult. She also drew on the architecture of Manchester. Campbell wrote some of the songs for Hinterland shortly after the release of her previous album, Nerve Up (2010). Hinterland was recorded over a period of 18 months, and was completed a year before it saw release. The album was recorded, mixed and produced by Campbell in her home studio in Manchester, with additional production with Bill Skibbe at Keyclub Recording Co., Michigan. Skibbe added live drums and LinnDrums to the mix.

Reception 

At Metacritic, which assigns a normalised rating out of 100 to reviews from mainstream critics, Hinterland received an average score of 83, based on 12 reviews, indicating "universal acclaim". Gareth O'Malley, writing for Drowned in Sound, said that the album was "a layered record that reveals more with each listen." AllMusic critic Heather Phares said that "Hinterlands tough, hard-won beauty reveals Campbell coming into her own." Annette Barlow of the Quietus called the album "a masterpiece". In his review for the Line of Best Fit, Chris Todd said that Campbell had "gone and made the finest pop record of 2015 so far." David Welsh of musicOMH said that the album "has to be one of the year's most satisfyingly accomplished long players."

Bobby Gillespie of Primal Scream picked Hinterland as his album of the year, stating 'Its just fucking cool. Its got a strange atmosphere and unique mood..''

Track listing

Personnel
Julie Campbell - guitar, keyboards, cello, vocals, bass, electronic drums, Clavinet, percussion, photography
Andrew Cheetham - drums
Andrew Mansberger - wood blocks, handclaps, Clavinet

References

External links 

2015 albums
Warp (record label) albums
Lonelady albums